Sven Köhler (born 24 February 1966) is a former German footballer and coach.

Career

Club career
Köhler began his playing career in the FC Karl-Marx-Stadt team of the late-1980s, reaching the East German Cup final in 1989 and finishing as league runners-up the following year. After German reunification, Köhler remained with the club, now called Chemnitzer FC, and played for four and a half seasons in the 2. Bundesliga, before leaving to join Erzgebirge Aue during the 1995–96 season. After half a year, Köhler returned to Chemnitz, who had been relegated to the Regionalliga Nordost, where he remained for another five years, the third of which ended in promotion back to the second tier. He left after the 2016–17 season.

International career
Köhler won two caps for East Germany, both coming in 1989. He made his debut as a substitute for Heiko Scholz in a 4–0 friendly win over Egypt, and also played in a 1990 FIFA World Cup qualifier against the USSR, a match which East Germany lost 3–0.

Coaching career
In 2001, Köhler joined Dynamo Dresden to serve as assistant manager to Christoph Franke, who had coached him at Chemnitz. He made two appearances for the club, but remained as assistant coach until Franke was dismissed in 2005, after earning two promotions to lift the club from the NOFV-Oberliga to the 2. Bundesliga. After Franke's departure, Köhler served as interim head coach and remained at Dynamo as coach of the under-19 team, before leaving to manage Hallescher FC in 2007. The club won the NOFV-Oberliga Süd, and direct promotion to the Regionalliga Nord, in his first season in charge. In the 2011–12 season, Köhler guided Halle to the Regionalliga Nord title, and promotion to the 3. Liga, after a three-way promotion battle with Holstein Kiel and RB Leipzig. Halle had conceded only 15 goals in the 34 league games, and achieved a clean sheet in 24 of those matches. He was sacked on 30 August 2015. He was appointed as the head coach of Chemnitzer FC on 2 March 2016.

Coaching record

References

External links

1966 births
Living people
German footballers
East German footballers
East Germany international footballers
Association football midfielders
Association football defenders
Chemnitzer FC players
FC Erzgebirge Aue players
Dynamo Dresden players
German football managers
Dynamo Dresden non-playing staff
2. Bundesliga players
Chemnitzer FC managers
3. Liga managers
DDR-Oberliga players
Sportspeople from Freiberg
Hallescher FC managers
Footballers from Saxony
People from Bezirk Karl-Marx-Stadt